Laurence Woodward (5 July 1918 – December 1997) was a Welsh professional footballer who made over 270 appearances in the Football League for Bournemouth & Boscombe Athletic as a wing half. After his retirement, he coached the youth and reserve teams at Bournemouth & Boscombe Athletic.

Personal life 
One of Woodward's relatives, Viv, was also a footballer and won one cap for Wales.

References

Footballers from Merthyr Tydfil
Welsh footballers
Association football wing halves
Wolverhampton Wanderers F.C. players
English Football League players
1918 births
Folkestone F.C. players
Southern Football League players
Walsall F.C. players
AFC Bournemouth players
AFC Bournemouth non-playing staff
1997 deaths
Neurological disease deaths in England
Deaths from Alzheimer's disease